The Massacre of the Innocents is a 1625-1632 painting by Nicolas Poussin, showing the Massacre of the Innocents. It was probably commissioned by the Roman collector Vincenzo Giustiniani, probably in memory of the tragic fate of the Giustiniani children taken hostage by the Ottoman Empire in 1564. It remained in the Palazzo Giustiniani until 1804, when it was bought by Lucien Bonaparte. It then passed through several other hands before being bought in London by Henri d'Orleans, Duke of Aumale. It is now in the Musée Condé in Chantilly, France.

References 

Paintings in the collection of the Musée Condé
1620s paintings
1630s paintings
Paintings by Nicolas Poussin
Poussin